Vadugapatti may refer to three places in Tamil Nadu, India:

 Vadugapatti, Erode, a panchayat town
 Vadugapatti, Karur, a village
 Vadugapatti, Theni, a panchayat town